Theuma was a town of Ancient Thessaly near the frontiers of Dolopia. Livy relates that the retreat of Philip V of Macedon after the Battle of the Aous (198 BC) allowed the Aetolians to occupy much of Thessaly, and these latter plundered Theuma and nearby Celathara, whereas Acharrae surrendered.

References

Cities in ancient Greece
Populated places in ancient Thessaly
Lost ancient cities and towns